The 32nd Infantry Division was a French Army formation during World War I and World War II.

World War 1
During World War I, the division comprised:
15th Infantry Regiment
53rd Infantry Regiment (to June 1915)
80th Infantry Regiment
143rd Infantry Regiment
342nd Infantry Regiment (from June 1915 to May 1917)
35th Territorial Infantry Regiment (from August 1918)

It was part of the French 16th Corps, during which it participated in the Battle of Morhange, Battle of Grand Couronné, Battle of Flirey, the First Battle of Ypres, the First Battle of Champagne, the Second Battle of Champagne, the Battle of the Lys and the pursuit to and past the Hindenburg line.

At various times, it was part of the French First Army, French Second Army, French Third Army, French Fifth Army, French Sixth Army, French Seventh Army, French Eighth Army and French Tenth Army.

World War 2
During the Battle of France in May 1940 the division contained the following units:

87th Infantry Regiment
122nd Infantry Regiment
143rd Infantry Regiment
38th Reconnaissance Group
3rd Artillery Regiment
203rd Artillery Regiment

It was an active division which existed during peacetime. During the evacuation of the British Expeditionary Force at Dunkirk, the division held the line towards the end of the battle before being evacuated across the English Channel.

In mid-June 1940, the division was recreated as 32nd Light Infantry Division in Normandy.

References

Infantry Division, 32nd
Infantry Division, 32nd
Infantry divisions of France